Kim Min-jung (born 26 March 1997) is a South Korean sport shooter. She won a bronze medal in the girls' 10 m air pistol shooting at the 2014 Summer Youth Olympics in Nanjing, China, and currently trains as a member of the shooting squad under KB Kookmin Bank. 

Kim stepped into the shooting scene, as a 17-year-old, at the 2014 Summer Youth Olympics in Nanjing, China. There, she left the three-way duel with a startling 175.4 to take home the bronze medal in the girls' 10 m air pistol, falling short to Poland's Agata Nowak and Russia's Margarita Lomova by almost a single-point margin.

At the 2016 Summer Olympics in Rio de Janeiro, Kim is slated to compete on her first senior South Korean team in the women's 10 m air pistol. Leading up to the Games, she collected a cumulative total of 1,923 points to earn one of the two available slots at the Olympic team trials for airgun in Naju.

Kim won the silver medal in the women's 25 metre pistol event at the 2020 Summer Olympics held in Tokyo, Japan.

References

External links

Nanjing 2014 Profile

1997 births
Living people
South Korean female sport shooters
Shooters at the 2014 Summer Youth Olympics
Sport shooters from Seoul
Olympic shooters of South Korea
Shooters at the 2016 Summer Olympics
Shooters at the 2018 Asian Games
Medalists at the 2018 Asian Games
Asian Games medalists in shooting
Asian Games silver medalists for South Korea
Asian Games bronze medalists for South Korea
ISSF pistol shooters
Universiade silver medalists for South Korea
Universiade bronze medalists for South Korea
Universiade medalists in shooting
Medalists at the 2019 Summer Universiade
Olympic medalists in shooting
Olympic silver medalists for South Korea
Shooters at the 2020 Summer Olympics
Medalists at the 2020 Summer Olympics
20th-century South Korean women
21st-century South Korean women